Tamara "Tammy" Crow DeClercq (born February 3, 1977) is an American competitor and coach in synchronized swimming.

Crow was born in St. Louis, Missouri. She participated in the  Santa Clara Aquamaids team. She won an Olympic bronze medal in the team competition. Teammates included Anna Kozlova, Alison Bartosik, Rebecca Jasontek, Sara Lowe, Lauren McFall, Stephanie Nesbitt and Kendra Zanotto.

She has gone on to coach synchronized swimming with teams including the Walnut Creek Aquanuts.

Vehicular accident
On February 16, 2003, Crow was driving in the Sierra Nevada when it slid off the road, killing two passengers, her then-boyfriend Cody Tatro, and a child in Tatro's care, 12-year-old Brett Slinger. Tatro had earlier promised to drive Slinger back to his parents, but Tatro was inebriated that evening so Crow got behind the wheel.

Although her blood level did not indicate alcohol at the scene of the accident, her admission of having had drinks the night before led the District Attorney to charge her with two misdemeanors of vehicular manslaughter. Crow pleaded no contest to vehicular manslaughter. The judge allowed Crow to postpone serving her 90-day jail sentence until after the 2004 Summer Olympics. Crow was released in 2004 after serving 50 days.

See also
 United States at the Olympics

References

1977 births
Living people
Sportspeople from St. Louis
Olympic bronze medalists for the United States in synchronized swimming
American synchronized swimmers
Synchronized swimmers at the 2004 Summer Olympics
Medalists at the 2004 Summer Olympics